VFM may refer to:

Value for money, a term in economics
Value for Money, a 1955 British film
Vision Forum Ministries
Voice for Men